All the Devils Are Here: The Hidden History of the Financial Crisis is a nonfiction book by authors Bethany McLean and Joseph Nocera about the 2008 financial crisis. It details how the financial crisis bubbled up from a volatile, and bipartisan, mixture of government meddling and laissez-faire. It concludes that the episode was not an accident, and that banks understood the big picture before the crisis happened but continued with bad practices nevertheless.

The title 
The title of the book comes from William Shakespeare's play The Tempest, in which he wrote "Hell is empty, and all the devils are here".

Notable people in the book 
 Angelo Mozilo
 Roland Arnall
 Maurice R. Greenberg
 Stan O'Neal
 Lloyd Blankfein
 Franklin Raines
 Brian Clarkson
 Alan Greenspan

Reviews 
Seeking Alpha
Seattle PI
Business Pundit
Business Week
New York Times
INC.com
Huffington Post
Washington Post
Forbes

References

External links 
C-SPAN Q&A interview with Bethany McLean on All the Devils are Here, November 14, 2010
 Discussion with Jon Stewart on The Daily Show
 

2010 non-fiction books
Business books
American non-fiction books
Finance books
Non-fiction books about the Great Recession